Serhiy But (born 20 November 1969) is a retired Ukrainian freestyle skier. He competed in the men's aerial event at the 1992 (demonstration), 1994 and 1998 Winter Olympics.

References

1969 births
Living people
Olympic freestyle skiers of Ukraine
Freestyle skiers at the 1992 Winter Olympics
Freestyle skiers at the 1994 Winter Olympics
Freestyle skiers at the 1998 Winter Olympics
Ukrainian male freestyle skiers
Sportspeople from Mykolaiv